Dost Mohammad (Urdu/Dari: دوست محمد), Dost Mohammad, Dost Mahomet and other variants is a male Muslim given name meaning friend of Muhammad. Notable bearers of the name include: 

Dost Muhammad (Moghul Khan) (1445–1468/9), Khan of Aqsu in Moghulistan
Dost Mohammad of Bhopal (1657–1728), founder of the Bhopal State in central India
Dost Mohammad Khan (1793–1863), Amir of Afghanistan, founder of the Barakzai dynasty
Haji Dost Muhammad Qandhari (1801–1868), Afghan Sufi master
Dost Mahomet (1873–1909), Australian cameleer
Dost Mohammad Khan Baloch (died 16 January 1930), ruler of Western Baluchistan until 1928
Dost Muhammad Khan (judge) (born 1953), judge of the Supreme Court of Pakistan
Dost Muhammad Khosa (born 1973), Pakistani politician
Dost Muhammad Rahimoon (born 1976), Pakistani politician, former Member of the Provincial Assembly of Sindh 
Dost Muhammad Mazari, Pakistani politician, Deputy Speaker of the Provincial Assembly of Punjab
Dost Muhammad Khan (senator), Pakistani politician, member of the Senate of Pakistan

Other people
Several "Afgan" cameleers in Australia, 1860s–1930s

See also

Dust Mohammad, a city in Iran

Afghan masculine given names
Pakistani masculine given names